This is a list of schools in Lancashire, England.

State-funded schools

Primary schools

Burnley

Barden Infant and Junior School, Burnley
Briercliffe Primary School, Briercliffe
Brunshaw Primary School, Burnley
Casterton Primary School, Burnley
Cherry Fold Community Primary School, Burnley
Christ The King RC Primary School, Burnley
Hapton CE/Methodist Primary School
Heasandford Primary School, Burnley
Holy Trinity CE Primary School, Burnley
Ightenhill Primary School, Burnley
Lowerhouse Junior School, Burnley
Padiham Green CE Primary School, Padiham
Padiham Primary School, Padiham
Rosegrove Infant School, Burnley
Rosewood Primary School, Burnley
St Augustine of Canterbury RC Primary School, Burnley
St James' Lanehead CE Primary School, Burnley
St John the Baptist RC Primary School, Burnley
St John The Baptist RC Primary School, Padiham
St John's CE Primary School, Cliviger
St Leonard's VA CE Primary School, Padiham
St Mary Magdalene's RC Primary School, Burnley
St Mary's RC Primary School, Burnley
St Peter's CE Primary School, Burnley
St Stephen's CE Primary School, Burnley
Springfield Community Primary School, Burnley
Stoneyholme Community Primary School, Burnley
Wellfield Methodist and Anglican Church School, Burnley
Whittlefield Primary School, Burnley
Worsthorne Primary School, Worsthorne

Chorley

Abbey Village Primary School, Abbey Village
Adlington Primary School, Adlington
All Saints CE Primary School, Chorley
Anderton Primary School, Adlington
Balshaw Lane Community Primary School, Euxton
Bretherton Endowed CE VA Primary School, Bretherton
Buckshaw Primary School, Astley Village
Christ Church CE Primary School, Charnock Richard
Clayton Brook Primary School, Clayton-le-Woods
Clayton-le-Woods CE Primary School, Clayton-le-Woods
Coppull Parish CE Primary School, Coppull
Coppull Primary School, Coppull
Duke Street Primary School, Chorley
Eccleston Primary School, Eccleston
Euxton CE VA Primary School, Euxton
Gillibrand Primary School, Chorley
Highfield Primary School, Chorley
Lancaster Lane Community Primary School, Clayton-le-Woods
Manor Road Primary School, Clayton-le-Woods
Pemberton's CE Primary School, Heskin
Primrose Hill Primary School, Euxton
Rivington Primary School, Rivington
Sacred Heart RC Primary School, Chorley
St Bede's RC Primary School, Clayton Green
St Chad's Catholic Primary School, Whittle-le-Woods
St George's CE Primary School, Chorley
St Gregory's RC Primary School, Chorley
St James' CE Primary School, Chorley
St James' CE VA Primary School, Brindle
St John's CE/Methodist Primary School, Brinscall
St John's CE VA Primary School, Coppull
St Joseph's RC Primary School, Anderton
St Joseph's RC Primary School, Chorley
St Joseph's RC Primary School, Hoghton
St Joseph's RC Primary School, Withnell
St Laurence CE Primary School, Chorley
St Mary's RC Primary School, Chorley
St Mary's RC Primary School, Euxton
St Mary's CE Primary School, Eccleston
St Oswald's RC Primary School, Coppull
St Paul's CE Primary School, Adlington
St Peter's CE Primary School, Chorley
St Peter's CE Primary School, Mawdesley
St Peter and St Paul RC Primary School, Mawdesley
Trinity CE/Methodist Primary School, Buckshaw Village
Trinity & St Michael's CE/Methodist Primary School, Croston
Westwood Primary School, Clayton-le-Woods
Whittle-le-Woods C of E Primary School, Whittle-le-Woods
Withnell Fold Primary School, Withnell

Fylde

Ansdell Primary School, Ansdell
Bryning with Warton St Paul's CE Primary School, Bryning-with-Warton
Clifton Primary School, Ansdell
Freckleton CE Primary School, Freckleton
Freckleton Strike Lane Primary School, Freckleton
Holy Family RC Primary School, Warton
Heyhouses Endowed CE primary school, Lytham St Annes
Kirkham St Michael's CE Primary School, Kirkham
Kirkham and Wesham Primary School, Kirkham
Kirkham The Willows RC Primary School, Kirkham
Lytham CE VA Primary School, Lytham St Annes
Lytham Hall Park Primary School, Lytham St Annes
Mayfield Primary School, Lytham St Annes
Medlar-with-Wesham CE Primary School, Medlar-with-Wesham
Newton Bluecoat CE Primary School, Newton-with-Scales
Our Lady Star of the Sea Catholic Primary School, Lytham St Annes
Ribby with Wrea Endowed CE Primary School, Wrea Green
St Joseph's RC Primary School, Medlar-with-Wesham
St Peter's RC Primary School, Lytham St Annes
St Thomas CE Primary School, Lytham St Annes
Singleton CE VA Primary School, Singleton
Staining CE VC Primary School, Singleton
Stanah Community Primary School, Thornton
Strike Lane Primary School, Freckleton
Treales CE Primary School, Treales
Weeton Primary School, Weeton
Weeton St Michael's CE VA Primary School, Weeton

Hyndburn

All Saints CE Primary School, Clayton-le-Moors
Altham St James CE Primary School, Altham
Baxenden St John CE Primary School, Baxenden
Benjamin Hargreaves VA CE Primary School, Accrington
Great Harwood Primary School, Great Harwood
Green Haworth CE Primary School, Green Haworth
Hippings Methodist VC Primary School, Oswaldtwistle
Huncoat Primary School, Huncoat
Hyndburn Park Primary School, Accrington
Knuzden St Oswald's CE Voluntary Aided Primary School, Knuzden
Moor End Primary School, Oswaldtwistle
Mount Pleasant Primary School, Clayton-le-Moors
Our Lady and St Huthbert's RC Primary School, Great Harwood
Peel Park Primary School, Accrington
Rishton Methodist Primary School, Rishton
Sacred Heart RC Primary School, Church
St Andrew's CE Primary School, Oswaldtwistle
St Anne's and St Joseph's RC Primary School, Accrington
St Bartholomew's Parish CE VA Primary School, Great Harwood
St Charles RC School, Rishton
St John with Augustine CE Primary School, Accrington
St John's CE Primary School, Great Harwood
St John's Stonefold CE Primary School, Accrington
St Mary Magdalen's CE Primary School, Accrington
St Mary's RC Primary School, Clayton-le-Moors
St Mary's RC Primary School, Oswaldtwistle
St Nicholas CE Primary School, Church
St Oswalds RC Primary School, Accrington
St Paul's CE VA Primary School, Oswaldtwistle
St Peter and St Paul's CE Primary School, Rishton
St Peter's CE Primary School, Accrington
St Wulstan's RC Primary School, Great Harwood
Spring Hill Community Primary School, Accrington
West End Primary School, Oswaldtwistle
Woodnook Primary School, Accrington

Lancaster

Arkholme CE Primary School, Arkholme
Bolton Le Sands CE Primary School, Bolton-le-Sands
Bowerham Community Primary School, Lancaster
Castle View Primary Academy, Lancaster
The Cathedral RC Primary School, Lancaster
Caton Community Primary School, Caton
Caton St Paul's CE Primary School, Caton
Cawthorne's Endowed Primary School, Abbeystead
Christ Church CE Primary School, Carnforth
Christ Church CE Primary School, Lancaster
Cockerham Parochial CE Primary School, Cockerham
Dallas Road Primary School, Lancaster
Dolphinholme CE Primary School, Dolphinholme
Ellel St John the Evangelist CE Primary School, Ellel
Great Wood Primary School, Morecambe
Grosvenor Park Primary School, Morecambe
Heysham St Peter's CE primary School, Heysham
Hornby St Margaret's CE Primary School, Hornby
Lancaster Road Primary School, Morecambe
Leck St Peter's CE Primary School, Leck
Moorside Primary School, Lancaster
Morecambe Bay Community Primary School, Morecambe
Mossgate Primary School, Heysham
Melling St Wilfred's CE Primary School, Melling
Nether Kellet Community Primary School, Nether Kellet
North Road Primary School, Carnforth
Our Lady of Lourdes RC Primary School, Carnforth
Over Kellet Wilson's Endowed CE Primary School, Over Kellet
Overton St Helen's CE Primary School, Overton
Poulton Le Sands CE Primary School, Morecambe
Quernmore CE primary School, Quernmore
Ridge Community Primary School, Lancaster
Ryelands Primary School, Lancaster
St Bernadette's RC Primary School, Lancaster
St Joseph's RC Primary School, Lancaster
St Mary's RC Primary School, Morecambe
St Patrick's RC Primary School, Heysham
St Wilfred's CE Primary School, Halton
Sandylands Community Primary School, Morecambe
Scotforth St Paul's CE Primary School, Lancaster
Silverdale St John's CE VA Primary School
Skerton St Luke's CE Primary School, Lancaster
Slyne with Hest St Luke's CE Primary School
Tatham Fells CE Primary School, Tatham
Thurnham Glasson Christ Church CE Primary School, Glasson Dock
Torrisholme Community Primary School, Morecambe
Trumacar Community Primary School, Heysham
Warton Archbishop Hutton's Primary School, Warton
West End Primary School, Morecambe
Westgate Primary School, Morecambe
Willow Lane Primary School, Lancaster
Wray with Botton Endowed Primary School, Wray
Yealand CE Primary School, Yealand Redmayne

Pendle

Al-Ikhlaas Primary School, Nelson
Barnoldswick CE Primary School, Barnoldswick
Barrowford School, Barrowford
Barrowford St Thomas CE Primary School, Barrowford
Blacko Primary School, Blacko
Bradley Primary School, Nelson
Brierfield Walter Street Primary School, Brierfield
Castercliff Primary School, Nelson
Central High School, Lancaster 
Christ Church CE VA Primary School, Colne
Coates Lane Primary School, Barnoldswick
Earby Springfield Primary School, Earby
Foulridge Saint Michael and All Angels CE VA Primary School, Foulridge
Gisburn Road Primary School, Barnoldswick
Great Marsden St John's CE Primary School, Nelson
Higham St John's CE Primary School, Higham
Holy Saviour RC Primary School, Nelson
Holy Trinity RC Primary School, Brierfield
Kelbrook Primary School, Kelbrook
Laneshaw Bridge Primary School, Laneshaw Bridge
Lomeshaye Junior School, Nelson
Lord Street School, Colne
Marsden Community Primary School, Nelson
Newchurch-in-Pendle St Mary's CE Primary School, Newchurch in Pendle
Park Primary School, Colne
Primet Primary School, Colne
Reedley Primary School, Reedley Hallows
Roughlee C of E Primary School, Roughlee
Sacred Heart RC Primary School, Colne
St John Southworth RC Primary School, Nelson
St Joseph's RC Primary School, Barnoldswick
St Paul's CE Primary School, Nelson
St Philip's CE Primary School, Nelson
Salterforth Primary School, Salterforth
Trawden Forest Primary School, Trawden
Walverden Primary School, Nelson
West Street Community Primary School, Colne
Wheatley Lane Methodist VA Primary School, Fence
Whitefield Infant and Nursery School, Nelson

Preston

Ashton Primary School, Preston
Barton St Lawrence CE Primary School, Barton
The Blessed Sacrament RC Primary School, Preston
Brockholes Wood Community Primary School, Preston
Brookfield Community Primary School, Preston
Broughton-in-Amounderness CE Primary School
Catforth Primary School, Catforth
Cottam Primary School, Cottam
Deepdale Infants School, Preston
Deepdale Junior School, Preston
Eldon Primary School, Preston
English Martyrs Catholic Primary School, Preston
Fishwick Primary School, Preston
Frenchwood Community Primary School, Preston
Fulwood and Cadley Primary School, Fulwood, Preston
Grange Primary School, Preston
Greenlands Community Primary School, Preston
Goosnargh Oliverson's CE Primary School, Goosnargh
Goosnargh Whitechapel Primary School, Goosnargh
Grimsargh St Michael's CE Primary School, Grimsargh
Harris Primary School, Fulwood
Holme Slack Community Primary School, Preston
Holy Family Catholic Primary School, Preston
Ingol Community Primary School, Preston
Kennington Primary School, Fulwood
Lea Community Primary School
Lea Neeld's Endowed CE Primary School
Lea St Mary's RC Primary School
Longsands Community Primary School, Fulwood
Moor Nook Community Primary School, Preston
The Olive School, Preston
Our Lady and St Edward's RC Primary School, Fulwood
Pool House Community Primary School, Preston
Queen Drive Primary School, Fulwood
Ribbleton Avenue Methodist Infant School, Preston
Ribbleton Avenue Methodist Junior School, Preston
The Roebuck School, Preston
Sacred Heart RC Primary School, Preston
St Andrew's CE Primary School, Preston
St Anthony's RC Primary School, Fulwood
St Augustine's RC Primary School, Preston
St Bernard's RC Primary School, Lea
St Clare's RC Primary School, Preston
St Francis RC Primary School, Goosnargh
St Gregory's RC Primary School, Preston
St Ignatius RC Primary School, Preston
St Joseph's RC Primary School, Preston
St Maria Goretti RC Primary School, Preston
St Mary and St Andrew's RC Primary School, Barton
St Matthew's CE Primary Academy, Preston
St Peter's CE Primary School, Fulwood
St Stephen's CE School, Preston
St Teresa's RC Primary School, Preston
Sherwood Primary School, Fulwood
Woodplumpton St Anne's CE Primary School, Woodplumpton

Ribble Valley

Alston Lane Catholic Primary School, Longridge
Balderstone St Leonard's CE VA Primary School, Balderstone
Barnacre Road Primary School, Longridge
Barrow Primary School, Clitheroe
Bolton by Bowland CE VA Primary School, Bolton-by-Bowland
Brabins Endowed School, Chipping
Brookside Primary School, Clitheroe
Chatburn CE Primary School, Chatburn
Edisford Primary School, Clitheroe
Gisburn Primary School, Gisburn
Grindleton CE VA Primary School, Grindleton
Langho and Billington St Leonards CE Primary School, Langho
Longridge CE Primary School, Longridge
Longridge St Wilfrid's RC Primary School, Longridge
Mellor St Mary CE Primary School, Mellor
Pendle Primary School, Clitheroe
Read St John's CE Primary School, Read
Ribchester St Wilfrid's CE VA Primary School, Ribchester
Sabden Primary School, Sabden
St James CE Primary School, Clitheroe
St Joseph's RC Primary School, Hurst Green
St Mary's RC Primary School, Chipping
St Mary's RC Primary School, Langho
St Mary's RC Primary School, Osbaldeston
St Mary's RC Primary School, Sabden
St Michael and St John's RC Primary School, Clitheroe
Salesbury CE Primary School, Salesbury
Simonstone St Peter's CE Primary School, Simonstone
Slaidburn Brennands Endowed Primary School, Slaidburn
Thorneyholme RC Primary School, Dunsop Bridge
Waddington and West Bradford CE VA Primary School, Waddington
Whalley CE Primary School, Whalley

Rossendale

Bacup Holy Trinity Stacksteads CE Primary School, Bacup
Bacup St Saviour's Community Primary School, Bacup
Bacup Thorn Primary School, Bacup
Britannia Community Primary School, Bacup
Crawshawbooth Primary School, Crawshawbooth
Edenfield CE Primary School, Edenfield
Haslingden Primary School, Haslingden
Haslingden Broadway Primary School, Haslingden
Haslingden St James CE Primary School, Haslingden
Helmshore Primary School, Helmshore
Northern Primary School, Bacup
Our Lady and St Anselm's RC Primary School, Whitworth 
Rawtenstall Balladen Community Primary School, Rawtenstall
Rawtenstall Newchurch CE Primary School, Rawtenstall
Rawtenstall St Anne's CE Primary School, Rawtenstall
Rawtenstall St Paul's Constable Lee CE Primary School, Rawtenstall
Rawtenstall Water Primary School, Rawtenstall
St Bartholomew's CE Primary School, Whitworth
St James-the-less RC Primary School, Rawtenstall
St John with St Michael CE Primary School, Shawforth
St Joseph's RC Primary School, Stacksteads
St Mary's CE Primary School, Rawtenstall
St Mary's RC Primary School, Bacup
St Mary's RC Primary School, Haslingden
St Peter's RC Primary School, Newchurch
St Veronica's RC Primary School, Helmshore
Sharneyford Primary School, Bacup
Tonacliffe Primary School, Whitworth
Waterfoot Primary School, Waterfoot

South Ribble

Bamber Bridge St Aidan's CE Primary School, Bamber Bridge
Brindle Gregson Lane Primary School, Hoghton
Broad Oak Primary School, Penwortham
Clayton Brook Primary School, Bamber Bridge
Cop Lane CE Primary School, Penwortham
Coupe Green Primary School, Coupe Green
Cuerden Church School, Bamber Bridge
Farington Primary School, Farington
Farington Moss St Paul's CE Primary School, Farington
Gregson Lane Primary School, Gregson Lane
Higher Walton CE Primary School, Walton-le-Dale
Hoole St Michael C of E Primary School, Much Hoole
Howick Church Endowed Primary School, Penwortham
Kingsfold Primary School, Penwortham
Lever House Primary School, Farington
Leyland Methodist Infant School, Leyland
Leyland Methodist Junior School, Leyland
Little Hoole Primary School, Walmer Bridge
Longton Primary School, Longton
Lostock Hall Community Primary School, Lostock Hall
Middleforth CE Primary School, Penwortham
Moss Side Primary School, Leyland
New Longton All Saints CE Primary School, New Longton
Northbrook Primary School, Leyland
Our Lady and St Gerard's RC Primary School, Lostock Hall
Penwortham Primary School, Penwortham
St Andrew's CE Infant School, Leyland
St Anne's Catholic Primary School, Leyland
St Catherine's RC Primary School, Leyland
St James CE Primary School, Leyland
St Joeseph's RC Primary School, Hoghton
St Mary Magdalen's RC Primary School, Penwortham
St Mary's and St Benedict's RC Primary School, Bamber Bridge
St Mary's RC Primary School, Leyland
St Oswald's RC Primary School, Longton
St Patrick's RC Primary School, Walton-le-Dale
St Teresa's Catholic Primary School, Penwortham
Samlesbury CE School, Samlesbury
Seven Stars Primary School, Leyland
Walton Le Dale Community Primary School, Walton-le-Dale
Walton Le Dale St Leonards CE Primary School, Walton-le-Dale
Whitefield Primary School, Penwortham
Woodlea Junior School, Leyland

West Lancashire

Appley Bridge All Saints CE Primary School, Appley Bridge
Asmall Primary School, Ormskirk
Banks Methodist Primary School, Banks
Banks St Stephen's CE Primary School, Banks
Bickerstaffe Voluntary Controlled CE School, Bickerstaffe
Bishop Martin CE Primary School, Skelmersdale
Brookfield Park Primary School, Skelmersdale
Burscough Bridge Methodist School, Burscough
Burscough Bridge St John's CE Primary School, Burscough
Burscough Lordsgate Township CE Primary School, Burscough
Burscough Village Primary School, Burscough
Christ Church CE VC Primary School, Aughton
Cobbs Brow Primary School, Skelmersdale
Crawford Village Primary School, Crawford Village
Crow Orchard Primary School, Skelmersdale
Dalton St Michael's CE Primary School, Dalton
Delph Side Community Primary School, Skelmersdale
Downholland-Haskayne VA CE Primary School, Haskayne
Halsall St Cuthbert's C of E Primary School, Halsall
Hesketh-with-Becconsall All Saints CE School, Hesketh Bank
Hillside Community Primary School, Skelmersdale
Holland Moor Primary School, Skelmersdale
Holmeswood Methodist School, Holmeswood
Lathom Park CE Primary School, Lathom
Little Digmoor Primary School, Skelmersdale
Maharishi School, Lathom
Mere Brow CE Primary School, Mere Brow
Moorside Community Primary School, Skelmersdale
Newburgh CE Primary School, Newburgh
Ormskirk CE Primary School, Ormskirk
Parbold Douglas CE Primary School, Parbold
Parbold Our Lady and All Saints RC Primary School, Parbold
Pinfold Primary School, Scarisbrick
Richard Durning's Endowed Primary School, Bispham Green
Rufford CE School, Rufford
St Anne's RC Primary School, Ormskirk
St Edmund's RC Primary School, Skelmersdale
St Francis of Assisi RC Primary School, Skelmersdale
St James RC Primary School, Skelmersdale
St James CE Primary School, Westhead
St John's RC Primary School, Burscough
St John's CE Primary School, Burscough
St John's RC Primary School, Skelmersdale
St Mark's CE Primary School, Scarisbrick
St Mary's RC Primary School, Scarisbrick
St Michael's CE Primary School, Aughton
St Richard's RC Primary School, Skelmersdale
St Teresa's RC Primary School, Upholland
St Thomas the Martyr VA CE Primary School, Upholland
Tarleton Community Primary School, Tarleton
Tarleton Holy Trinity CE Primary School, Tarleton
Town Green Primary School, Aughton
Trinity CE/Methodist Primary School, Skelmersdale
Up Holland Roby Mill CE VA Primary School, Upholland
West End Primary School, Ormskirk
Woodlands Community Primary School, Skelmersdale
Wrightington Mossy Lea Primary School, Wrightington
Wrightington St Joseph's RC Primary School, Wrightington

Wyre

Baines Endowed VC Primary School, Thornton-Cleveleys
Bilsborrow John Cross CE Primary School, Bilsborrow
Bleasdale CE Primary School, Bleasdale
The Breck Primary School, Poulton-le-Fylde
Calder Vale St John's CE Primary School, Calder Vale
Carleton Green Community Primary School, Carleton
Carleton St Hilda's CE Primary School, Carleton
Carr Head Primary School, Poulton-le-Fylde
Charles Saer Primary School, Fleetwood
Chaucer Community Primary School, Fleetwood
Claughton on Brock St Mary's RC Primary School, Claughton
Flakefleet Primary School, Fleetwood
Forton Primary School, Forton
Garstang Community Primary School, Garstang
Garstang St Thomas CE Primary School, Garstang
Garstang SS Mary and Michael RC Primary School, Garstang
Great Eccleston Copp CE Primary School, Great Eccleston
Hambleton Primary Academy, Hambleton
Inskip St Peter's CE VA School, Inskip
Kirkland and Catterall St Helen's CE Primary School, Churchtown
Larkholme Primary School, Fleetwood
Manor Beach Primary School, Thornton-Cleveleys
Nateby Primary School, Nateby
Northhold Community Primary School, Thornton-Cleveleys
Pilling St John's CE Primary School, Pilling
Pilling St William's RC Primary School, Pilling
Preesall Carter's Charity VC Primary School, Preesall
Preesall Fleetwood's Charity School, Preesall
Royles Brook Primary School, Thornton-Cleveleys
Sacred Heart RC Primary School, Thornton-Cleveleys
St Chad's CE Primary School, Poulton-le-Fylde
St Johns Catholic Primary School, Poulton-le-Fylde
St Mary's RC Primary School, Fleetwood
St Mary's RC Primary School, Great Eccleston
St Michaels on Wyre CE Primary School, St Michael's on Wyre
St Wulstan's and St Edmund's RC Primary Academy, Fleetwood
Scorton CE Primary School, Scorton
Shakespeare Primary School, Fleetwood
Stalmine Primary School, Stalmine
Stanah Primary School, Thornton-Cleveleys
Thornton Primary School, Thornton-Cleveleys
Winmarleigh CE Primary School, Winmarleigh

Non-selective secondary schools

Academy@Worden, Leyland
Accrington Academy, Accrington
Albany Academy, Chorley
Alder Grange School, Rawtenstall
All Hallows Catholic High School, Penwortham
All Saints' Catholic High School, Rawtenstall
Archbishop Temple School, Fulwood
Ashton Community Science College, Ashton
Baines School, Poulton-le-Fylde
Balshaw's CE High School, Leyland
Bay Leadership Academy, Heysham
Bishop Rawstorne CofE Academy, Croston
Blessed Trinity RC College, Burnley
Bowland High School, Grindleton
Broughton High School, Broughton
Brownedge St Mary's Catholic High School, Bamber Bridge
Burnley High School, Burnley
Burscough Priory Academy, Burscough
Cardinal Allen Catholic High School, Fleetwood
Carnforth High School, Carnforth
Carr Hill High School, Kirkham
Central Lancaster High School, Lancaster
Christ the King Catholic High School, Preston
Colne Primet Academy, Colne
Corpus Christi Catholic High School, Fulwood
Eden Boys' School, Preston
Fleetwood High School, Fleetwood
Fulwood Academy, Fulwood
Garstang Community Academy, Bowgreave
Haslingden High School, Haslingden
Hodgson Academy, Poulton-le-Fylde
The Hollins, Accrington
Holy Cross Catholic High School, Chorley
Hutton Grammar School, Hutton
The Hyndburn Academy, Rishton
Lathom High School, Skelmersdale
Longridge High School, Longridge
Lostock Hall Academy, Lostock Hall
Lytham St Annes High School, Lytham St Annes
Maharishi School, Lathom
Marsden Heights Community College, Brierfield
Millfield Science & Performing Arts College, Thornton
Moor Park High School, Preston
Morecambe Bay Academy, Morecambe
Mount Carmel RC High School, Accrington
Ormskirk School, Ormskirk
Our Lady Queen of Peace Catholic Engineering College, Skelmersdale
Our Lady's Catholic College, Lancaster
Our Lady's Catholic High School, Fulwood
Park High School, Colne
Parklands High School, Chorley
Pendle Vale College, Nelson
Penwortham Girls' High School, Penwortham
Penwortham Priory Academy, Penwortham
Preston Muslim Girls High School, Preston
Rhyddings, Oswaldtwistle
Ribblesdale High School, Clitheroe
Ripley St Thomas Church of England Academy, Lancaster
St Aidan's CE High School, Preesall
St Augustine's RC High School, Billington
St Bede's Catholic High School, Lytham St Annes
St Bede's Catholic High School, Ormskirk
St Cecilia's RC High School, Longridge
St Christopher's CE High School, Accrington
St Mary's RC High School, Leyland
St Michael's CE High School, Chorley
Ss John Fisher and Thomas More RC High School, Colne
Shuttleworth College, Padiham
Sir John Thursby Community College, Burnley
Southlands High School, Chorley
Tarleton Academy, Tarleton
Unity College, Burnley
Up Holland High School, Upholland
The Valley Leadership Academy, Bacup
Walton-le-Dale High School, Bamber Bridge
Wellfield Academy, Leyland
West Craven High School, Barnoldswick
Whitworth Community High School, Whitworth

Grammar schools
Bacup and Rawtenstall Grammar School, Waterfoot
Clitheroe Royal Grammar School, Clitheroe
Lancaster Girls' Grammar School, Lancaster
Lancaster Royal Grammar School, Lancaster

Special and alternative schools

Acorns Primary School, Preston
The Acorns School, Ormskirk
Bleasdale School, Silverdale
Broadfield Specialist School, Oswaldtwistle
Brookfield School, Poulton Le Fylde
Chadwick High School, Skerton
Chorley Astley Park School, Chorley
Coal Clough Academy, Burnley
The Coppice School, Bamber Bridge
Elm Tree Community Primary School, Skelmersdale
Golden Hill Pupil Referral Unit, Leyland
Great Arley School, Thornton Clevelys
The Heights, Burnley
Hillside Specialist School, Longridge
Holly Grove School, Burnley
Hope High School, Skelmersdale
Kingsbury Primary Special School, Skelmersdale
Kirkham Pear Tree School, Kirkham
Larches High School, Preston
Lostock Hall Moor Hey School, Lostock Hall
The Loyne Specialist School, Lancaster
Mayfield School, Chorley
McKee College House, Poulton
Moorbrook School, Fulwood
Morecambe Road School, Morecambe
Oswaldtwistle School, Oswaldtwistle
Oswaldtwistle White Ash School, Oswaldtwistle
Pendle Community High School, Nelson
Pendle View Primary School, Colne
Pontville School, Ormskirk
Rawtenstall Cribden House Community Special School, Rawtenstall
Ridgewood Community High School, Burnley
The Rose School, Burnley
Royal Cross Primary School, Ashton-on-Ribble
Shaftesbury High School, Chorley
Sir Tom Finney Community High School, Preston
Stepping Stones School, Lancaster
Thornton-Cleveleys Red Marsh School, Thornton Clevelys
Tor View School, Haslingden
West Lancashire Community High School, Skelmersdale
Westmorland School, Chorley

Further education

Accrington and Rossendale College
The Adult College, Lancaster
Blackpool and The Fylde College
Burnley College
Cardinal Newman College
Lancashire College
Lancaster University School of Mathematics
Lancaster and Morecambe College
Myerscough College
Nelson and Colne College
Preston's College
Runshaw College
Thomas Whitham Sixth Form
West Lancashire College

Independent schools

Primary and preparatory schools

Al-Ikhlaas Primary School, Nelson
Ashbridge School, Hutton
Highfield Priory School, Fulwood
Imam Muhammad Zakariya School, Preston
Lancaster Steiner School, Lancaster
Rawdhatul Uloom, Burnley
St Joseph's Park Hill School, Burnely
St Pius X Preparatory School, Fulwood
Stonyhurst Saint Mary's Hall, Hurst Green

Senior and all-through schools

Abrar Academy, Preston
The Alternative School, Barnoldswick
AKS Lytham, Lytham St Annes
Edenfield Girls High School, Edenfield
Ghausia Girls' High School, Nelson
Heathland School, Accrington
Jamea Al Kauthar, Lancaster
Kirkham Grammar School, Kirkham
Moorland School, Clitheroe
Oakhill School, Whalley
Olive High, Burnley
OneSchool Global UK, Hornby
Rossall School, Rossall
St Annes College Grammar School, Lytham St Annes
Scarisbrick Hall School, Scarisbrick
Stonyhurst College, Hurst Green

Special and alternative schools

The Aspire Hub, Burnley
Aurora Brambles School, Midge Hall
Aurora Keyes Barn School, Salwick
Austen House, Bredbury
Belmont School, Rawtenstall
Bridgeway School, Bamber Bridge
Calder Lodge School, Oakenclough
Cambian Brook View School, Ribchester
Cambian Red Rose School, Bamber Bridge
Compass Community School Lancashire, Briercliffe
Crookhey Hall School, Cockerham
Cumberland School, Rivington
Hope School, Catforth
Learn 4 Life School, Skelmersdale
Lincoln House School, Burnley
Linton School, Freckleton
Maple House, Eccles
Mayfield House School, Chorley
Meadow View Learning Centre, Chorley
Moorlands View School, Dunnockshaw
The Nook School, Colne
Oakfield House School, Salwick
Oliver House School, Astley Village
Pioneer TEC, Preston
Pontville School, Ormskirk
Poplar House School, Lytham St Annes
Progress School, Bamber Bridge
Prospect House, Yealand Redmayne
Red Rose School, Lytham St Annes
Rosa House, Briercliffe
Roselyn House School, Leyland
Rossendale School, Ramsbottom
Springfield House School, Pilling
Stonegate School, Lancaster
Waterloo Lodge, Chorley
Westmorland School, Chorley
Wood Edge Independent School, Ormskirk

Lancashire

Schools